Nannoarctia takanoi, described by Jinhaku Sonan in 1934, is an endemic species of moth in the family Erebidae from Taiwan. It is probably extinct now; no specimens have been collected since World War II. The species was formerly known as Pericallia integra Matsumura, 1931, but specimens from Taiwan are not conspecific to those from the Philippines, where N. integra (Walker, 1855) occur.

The forewings are blackish with narrow oblique light fascia abutting on the apex and with a subapical spot mostly narrower than its length. The hindwings are yellow with discal and submarginal, sometimes confluent, black spots.

References
 
Matsumura, S. (1931). 6000 Illustrated Insects of Japan-Empire: 1497+191 p., Tokyo (in Japanese).
Sonan, J. (1934) "On three new species of the moths in Japan and Formosa". Kontyû. 8: 212–214, Tokyo.

Moths described in 1934
Spilosomina